Notre Dame – RVM College of Cotabato is a private, Catholic basic and higher education institution run by the Congregation of the Religious of the Virgin Mary in Cotabato City, Maguindanao, Philippines. It was established by the RVM Sisters in 1904. Notre Dame - RVM College is a member of the Notre Dame Educational Association, a group of schools named Notre Dame in the Philippines under the patronage of the Blessed Virgin Mary. Alumni and students of the institution are often called as RVMians or Marians.

History
Notre Dame – RVM College of Cotabato began as a school founded by the Beatas (now RVM Sisters) and named the Escuela Catolica. In 1904, the Superior General of the Beatas, Reverend Mother Elfigenia Alvarez sent four Beatas, namely Sr. Isabel Cero Mojado, RVM, Sr. Valentina Lorenzo, RVM, Sr. Filomena Galos, RVM and Sr. Severina Santos, RVM to open a Catholic school in Cotobato City . The first classes were held at the home of Don Antonio and Doña Eusebia Sousa, the generous benefactors of the Sisters. In 1917, the school obtained the government recognition and was granted the authority to issue certificates to the elementary school graduates. The subjects taught were Christian Doctrines, Reading and Writing, Drawing and Painting, and Home Arts for Girls. Until 1911, all instructions were in Spanish. When English became the medium of instruction, Spanish continued to be taught as a subject in all levels.

The school underwent several name changes from Escluela Catolica to Escuela de San Antonio, Colegio de los Corazones y Maria and finally, Cotabato Parochial School which it bore until World War II stopped its operation.

In, 1947, Archbishop Mongeau, then the O.M.I. Father Superior, founded the Notre Dame of Cotabato, a co – educational Catholic High School which in 1948 was separated into Boys' and Girls' Departments. The Marist Brothers, took over the administration of the Boys Department and remained in the original site of the School while the RVM Sisters, under the leadership of Sr. Ma. Isabel Purification, RVM moved the Girls Department to the Notre Dame of Cotabato. In 1979, Notre Dame of Cotabato for Girls Department finally became Notre Dame of Cotabato for Girls.

In 1984, the grade school department started to accept boys, while in 2000 the high school department started to accept boys too. Then in school year 2002–2003, the school underwent another change of name, Notre Dame – RVM School of Cotabato.

Various improvements happened under the leadership of Sr. Ma. Zosima N. Capua, RVM, the Directress. It saw the completion of the four-storey Mother Ignacia Building which houses the fourth year high school classes and the air-conditioned library.

Notre Dame – RVM School of Cotabato opened its college department starting school year 2003–2004. Two short term courses were offered: Hotel and Restaurant Management (2 years) and Caregiver Program (7 months). All classes were held in the new Mother Ignacia building.

In school year 2004–2005, the school celebrated its centennial year and the name was changed into Notre Dame – RVM College of Cotabato. Additional college courses were offered: Bachelor of Elementary Education and Bachelor of Science in Secondary Education with majors in English and Mathematics.

In the school year 2013–2014, the school directress was replaced by Sister Maria Fe Gerodias, RVM. In the same year a rehabilitation of Terrace 1 was made. The school underwent a major revamp during the years 2014-2015. The boys and girls were separated. The Old Mother Tan Building was also refurbished. Almost half of the school buildings were repainted.

On July 2, 2014 (Wednesday), a new school bus arrived on the campus but is only used for the annual trip to the retreat house in Davao City, Philippines.

Basic Education Department 
The K-12 Program was implemented in the school starting the academic year 2015–2016. The campus offers the following:

 Kindergarten (Kinder 1 to 2)
 Grade School (Grade 1 to 6)
 Junior High School (Grade 7 to 10)
 Senior High School (Grade 11 to 12)

Senior High School 
During the school year 2015–2016, Notre Dame – RVM College of Cotabato accepted its first batch of Senior High School students. The Senior High School department houses its students in the newer buildings of the campus, the Assumption Building and Annunciation Building, with the exception of some sections which are located in the BSB 2 Building. Following are the strands offered by the school:

Academic Track 
 Science, Technology, Engineering, and Mathematics
 Accountancy, Business, and Management
 Humanities and Social Sciences

College Department

BS in Information Technology (BSIT)

BS in Hotel and Restaurant Management (BS – HRM)

BS in Business Administration( BSBA)  
 Major in Financial Management
 Major in Marketing Management

Bachelor of Secondary Education (BSEd)  
 Major in English
 Major in Filipino
 Major in Physical Science
 Major in Mathematics

Bachelor of Elementary Education (BEED)

Associate Courses 
 Associate in Computer Technology (ACT)
 Associate in Hotel and Restaurant Management (AHRM)

Tesda Courses  
 Various Recognized Tesda Courses

Infrastructures 

 Assumption Building
 Annunciation Building
 Gymnasium
 Bishop Smith Building 1
 Bishop Smith Building 2
 Bishop Smith Building 3
 Mother Ignacia Building
 Mother Tan Building
 Administrative Building
 HRM Building
 Swimming Pool
 Grandstand
 Terrace 2
 Bakery
 Mini-Canteen
 Soccer Field

Facilities 
The following are the facilities provided by the campus.

Mother Tan Building 
 School Clinic
 Christian Formation Center
 Grade School Computer Laboratory
 Grade School Library
 Grade School Audio-Visual Room
 Grade School Science Laboratory

Mother Ignacia Building 
 School Canteen
 High School Computer Laboratory
 High School Internet Laboratory
 High School Library
 College Computer Laboratory

Bishop Smith Building 1 
 High School Science Laboratory

Bishop Smith Building 2 
 Technology and Livelihood Education Laboratory
 Prayer Room for Muslim (Girls)

Administrative Building 
 Main Audio-Visual Room
 Prayer Room for Muslim (Boys)
 Chapel

Annunciation Building 
 Tech-Voc Computer Laboratory
 Roof Deck Audio-Visual Room

Others 
 HRM Laboratory
 Gymnasium
 Swimming Pool
 2 Mini-Canteens
 Kiosk
 Radio Ignacia 87.9 FM (Campus Radio Station)

Other Notre Dame Schools in the Philippines
 Notre Dame University - Cotabato City
 Notre Dame of Dadiangas University
 Notre Dame of Marbel University
 Notre Dame of Tacurong College
 Notre Dame of Midsayap College
 Notre Dame of Kidapawan College
 Notre Dame of Greater Manila
 Notre Dame of Kalamansig

References

External links
Eskwelahan.com
ND-RVMCC learning platform

Catholic elementary schools in the Philippines
Catholic secondary schools in the Philippines
Notre Dame Educational Association
Oblate schools in the Philippines
Religious of the Virgin Mary
Schools in Cotabato City
Universities and colleges in Cotabato City
Educational institutions established in 1904
1904 establishments in the Philippines